Valentin Stansel or Stanzel (1621 – 18 December 1705) was a Czech Jesuit astronomer who worked in Brazil.

Biography
Valentin Stanzel was born in Olomouc, Moravia. His family were of German minority ethnicity in Moravia. He entered the Society of Jesus on 1 October 1637, and taught rhetoric and mathematics at University of Olomouc and in Prague. After being ordained, he requested an appointment to the Jesuit mission in India, and went to Portugal to await an opportunity of taking ship for his destination. Meantime, he lectured on astronomy at the college of Évora. While there, in order to conform to the language of the country, he changed his name to the form "Estancel", in which form it appears on the title pages of most of his published works.

He was unable to procure passage to India, traveling instead to Brazil, where he was attached to the Jesuit College and Seminary of Salvador, Bahia, as professor of Moral Theology. He also later served as the institution's Superior. At the same time he continued his astronomical work, and made extensive observations, particularly on comets, the results of which he was sending to Europe for publication.

On 5 March 1668 Valentin Stanzel discovered a bright comet. His observations of the comet of 1668 are mentioned in Newton's Principia.

Valentin Stanzel died in Salvador, Bahia, Brazil.

Chief works
 (Prague, 1652 or 1654)
 (Olmütz, 1655)
 (Évora, 1658)

 (Évora, 1675)
 (Prague, 1683)
 (Antwerp and Ghent, 1685)

See also
List of Jesuit scientists
List of Roman Catholic scientist-clerics

Notes

References
 Cites
Sommervogel, Carlos, Bibl. de la C. de J., VII (Brussels, 1896)

1621 births
1705 deaths
Czech Jesuits
Czech astronomers
Moravian-German people
Clergy from Olomouc
Catholic clergy scientists
Jesuit missionaries in Brazil
Academic staff of the University of Évora
17th-century astronomers
Jesuit scientists
Czech Roman Catholic missionaries
Czech expatriates in Brazil
Academic staff of Palacký University Olomouc
Scientists from Olomouc